Humana Festival of New American Plays is an internationally renowned festival that celebrates the contemporary American playwright. Produced annually in Louisville, Kentucky by Actors Theatre of Louisville, this festival showcases new theatrical works and draws producers, critics, playwrights, and theatre lovers from around the world.  The festival was founded in 1976 by Jon Jory, who was Producing Director of Actors Theatre of Louisville from 1969 to 2000. Since 1979 The Humana Festival has been sponsored by the Humana Foundation which is the philanthropic arm of Humana.

History

The Actor's Theater of Louisville hosted the first Festival of New American Plays in March 1977. It was founded by the former artistic director of the Actor's Theater, Jon Jory. The Gin Game by D.L. Coburn, one of the plays presented that year, went on to open on Broadway later that year and would win the Pulitzer Prize for Drama in 1978. The 1978 festival line up included Marsha Norman's Getting Out, and in 1979, Crimes of the Heart by Beth Henley. It was also the first year that the festival was sponsored by the Humana Festival.

Over the 400 plays (short pieces, ten-minute plays, one-acts, and full-lengths) the festival has produced, many have gone on to win several awards. Dinner With Friends by Donald Margulies, The Gin Game by D.L. Coburn, and, Crimes of the Heart by Beth Henley have all won the Pulitzer Prize for Drama. Keely and Du by Jane Martin, Becky Shaw by Gina Gionfriddo, and Omnium-Gatherum by Alexandra Gersten-Vassilaros and Theresa Rebeck have all been finalists for the prize.

Lucas Hnath's The Christians, Appropriate by Branden Jacobs-Jenkins, Big Love by Charles Mee, Slavs! by Tony Kushner, My Left Breast by Susan Miller, Marisol by José Rivera and One Flea Spare by Naomi Wallace have all won Obie Awards.

How to Say Goodbye by Mary Gallagher, My Sister in this House by Wendy Kesselman, A Narrow Bed by Ellen McLaughlin, My Left Breast by Susan Miller and One Flea Spare by Naomi Wallace have won the Susan Smith Blackburn Prize, and nine other plays produced at the festival have been finalists.

2 by Romulus Linney, Dinner with Friends by Donald Margulies, Getting Out by Marsha Norman, and Jane Martin's Talking With…, Keely and Du, Jack and Jill, and Anton in Show Business have won the Steinberg/American Theatre Critics Association New Play Award, and Dinner with Friends by Donald Margulies, Big Love by Charles Mee, After Ashley by Gina Gionfriddo, Great Falls by Lee Blessing, Edith Can Shoot Things and Hit Them by A.Rey Pamatmat, and Lucas Hnath's Death Tax and The Christians have won Steinberg/American Theatre Critics Association New Play Award Citations.

Jeff Augustin's and Peter Sinn Nachtrieb’ s plays, Cry Old Kingdom and BOB: A Life in Five Acts respectively, have won the Barrie and Bernice Stavis Award, given by the National Theatre Conference to outstanding emerging playwrights.

List of plays produced 
2016
 Residence by Laura Jacqmin
 For Peter Pan on Her 70th Birthday by Sarah Ruhl
 This Random World by Steven Dietz
 Wellesley Girl by Brendan Pelsue
 Cardboard Piano by Hansol Jung
 Wondrous Strange by Martyna Majok, Meg Miroshnik, Jiehae Park, and Jen Silverman
The Ten-Minute Plays:
 Coffee Break by Tasha Gordon-Solmon
 This Quintessence of Dust by Cory Hinkle
 Trudy, Carolyn, Martha, and Regina Travel to Outer Space and Have a Pretty Terrible Time There by James Kennedy

2015
 The Roommate by Jen Silverman
 Dot by Colman Domingo
 I Will Be Gone by Erin Courtney
 The Glory of the World by Charles L. Mee
 I Promised Myself to Live Faster, conceived and created by Pig Iron Theatre Company, text by Gregory S. Moss and Pig Iron Theatre Company
 That High Lonesome Sound, by Jeff Augustin, Diana Grisanti, Cory Hinkle, and Charise Castro
The Ten-Minute Plays:
 Rules of Comedy by Patricia Cotter
 So Unnatural a Level by Gary Winter
 Joshua Consumed an Unfortunate Pear by Steve Yockey

2014 
 Partners by Dorothy Fortenberry
 The Christians by Lucas Hnath
 The Grown-Up by Jordan Harrison
 brownsville song (b-side for tray) by Kimber Lee
 Steel Hammer created by SITI Company, music and lyrics by Julia Wolfe, original text by Kia Corthron, Will Power, Carl Hancock Rux and Regina Taylor 
 Remix 38 by Jackie Sibblies Drury, Idris Goodwin, Basil Kreimendahl, Justin Kuritzkes and Amelia Roper
The Ten-Minute Plays:
 Winter Games by Rachel Bonds
 Some Prepared Remarks (A History in Speech) by Jason Gray Platt
 Poor Shem by Gregory Hischak

2013
 The Delling Shore by Sam Marks
 Appropriate by Branden Jacobs-Jenkins
 Cry Old Kingdom by Jeff Augustin
 Gnit  by Will Eno
 O Guru Guru Guru, or why I don't want to go to yoga class with you by Mallery Avidon
  Sleep Rock Thy Brain by Rinne Groff, Lucas Hnath, and Anne Washburn
The Ten-Minute Plays:
 Halfway by Emily Schwend
 27 Ways I Didn't Say "Hi" to Laurence Fishburne by Jonathan Josephson
 Two Conversations Overheard on Airplanes by Sarah Ruhl

2012
 Eat Your Heart Out by Courtney Baron
 How We Got On by Idris Goodwin
 Death Tax by Lucas Hnath
 Michael von Siebenburg Melts Through the Floorboards by Greg Kotis
 The Veri**on Play by Lisa Kron
 The Hour of Feeling by Mona Mansour
 Oh, Gastronomy! by Michael Golamco, Carson Kreitzer, Steve Moulds, Tanya Saracho, and Matt Schatz
The Ten-Minute Plays:
 The Dungeons and the Dragons by Kyle John Schmidt
 Hero Dad by Laura Jacqmin
 The Ballad of 423 and 424 by Nicholas C. Pappas

2011
 Mr. Smitten by Laura Eason
 Maple and Vine by Jordan Harrison
 Hygiene by Gregory Hischak
 Chicago, Sudan by Marc Bamuthi Joseph
 Elemeno Pea by Molly Smith Metzler
 BOB by Peter Sinn Nachtrieb
 Edith Can Shoot Things and Hit Them by A. Rey Pamatmat
 The Edge of Our Bodies by Adam Rapp
 A Devil at Noon by Anne Washburn
 The End by Dan Dietz, Jennifer Haley, Allison Moore, A. Rey Pamatmat, and Marco Ramirez.

2010
 Let Bygones Be by Gamal Abdel Chasten
 HEIST! conceived and created by Sean Daniels and Deborah Stein, written by Deborah Stein
 Lobster Boy by Dan Dietz
 Ground by Lisa Dillman
 Fissures (lost and found) by Steve Epp, Cory Hinkle, Dominic Orlando, Dominique Serrand, Deborah Stein and Victoria Stewart
 Post Wave Spectacular by Diana Grisanti
 An Examination of the Whole Playwright/Actor Relationship Presented As Some Kind of Cop Show Parody by Greg Kotis
 Sirens by Deborah Zoe Laufer
 The Method Gun created by Rude Mechs, written by Kirk Lynn
 The Cherry Sisters Revisited by Dan O'Brien with original music by Michael Friedman
 Phoenix by Scott Organ.

2009
 Ameriville by UNIVERSES (Steven Sapp; Mildred Ruiz-Sapp; Gamal Abdel Chasten; William Ruiz a.k.a.- NINJA)
 Slasher by Allison Moore
 Absalom by Zoe Kazan
 The Hard Weather Boating Party by Naomi Wallace
 Under Construction by Charles L. Mee, produced in association with the SITI Company
 Wild Blessings: A Celebration of Wendell Berry adapted for the stage by Marc Masterson and Adrien-Alice Hansel, original music by Malcolm Dalglish
 Brink! by Lydia R. Diamond, Kristoffer Diaz, Greg Kotis, Deborah Zoe Laufer, Peter Sinn Nachtrieb and Deborah Stein
 On the Porch One Crisp Spring Morning by Alex Dremann
 3:59am: a drag race for two actors by Marco Ramirez
 Roanoke by Michael Lew, music and lyrics by Matt Schatz

See also
 List of attractions and events in the Louisville metropolitan area
 Performing arts in Louisville, Kentucky

References

External links
 
 Humana Festival of New American Plays CD ROM

Festivals established in 1976
Theatre festivals in the United States
Festivals in Louisville, Kentucky
1976 establishments in Kentucky